Għar Lapsi is a small bay near Siġġiewi, Malta. It lies about 1 km south-west of the Blue Grotto. 

Caves of Malta
Bays of Malta
Underwater diving sites in Malta
Siġġiewi